Lithophane fagina, the hoary pinion, is a species of cutworm or dart moth in the family Noctuidae. It is found in North America.

The MONA or Hodges number for Lithophane fagina is 9917.

References

Further reading

 
 
 

fagina
Articles created by Qbugbot
Moths described in 1874